Gilbert Greenall,  (born 16 August 1954) is a senior adviser to both the UK government and United Nations on humanitarian emergencies and the welfare of civilians during and after conflict.

Greenall was born the second son of the 3rd Baron Daresbury. His elder brother is Peter Greenall, 4th Baron Daresbury.

Greenall has worked on 37 humanitarian emergencies, of which 18 were conflict-related, given evidence to the UK Defence Committee on Afghanistan and spoken at the Royal Society of Medicine on emergency healthcare and welfare of civilians during conflict.

Greenall has been adviser to British military commanders in Northern Iraq, Bosnia, East Timor, Sierra Leone, Macedonia, to the commander of UNIFIL in Southern Lebanon, and the deputy commanders in both Iraq and Afghanistan.

Following a presentation to the UK Defence Academy in 2003, Greenall wrote an article for the British Army Review entitled "Winning the Peace: Post Conflict Recovery in the 21st Century".

After Eton and Sandhurst, Greenall completed a short service commission in the Life Guards for four years before going to business school at Fontainebleu in France where he obtained a bilingual English/French MBA. He qualified with a Bachelor of Medicine (MB) & Bachelor of Surgery (ChB) from Bristol University, and spent 10 years on and off as a senior house officer at Cheltenham General Hospital while beginning his humanitarian career as a volunteer in the jungles of Cambodia.

From the final days of the Khmer Rouge to the chaos of Baghdad in 2016, Greenall describes his involvement in human catastrophe in his 2019 memoir ''Combat Civilian. (Book Guild Publishing).

Greenall was appointed a Commander of the Order of the British Empire in 1993, awarded an honorary doctorate in Medicine by the University of Bristol in 2006, and served as High Sheriff of Herefordshire in 2009–10.

References

Living people
1954 births
People educated at Eton College
Graduates of the Royal Military Academy Sandhurst
Alumni of the University of Bristol
INSEAD alumni
Greenall family